Gresford is a locality in the Dungog Shire, New South Wales, Australia.

Events 

 Australia Day Luncheon 26 January
 Gresford Agricultural Show Second Friday and Saturday  in March
 Gresford Billy Cart Derby Easter Sunday
 Gresford Rodeo and Campdraft on the last weekend in August
 Landcare Annual Field day and Dinner held in October
 GAPS carols held in December

References

Dungog Shire